RV Atlantic Explorer is a twin-screw ocean vessel. It is owned and operated by the Bermuda Institute of Ocean Sciences (BIOS) in coordination with and as a part of the University-National Oceanographic Laboratory System (UNOLS) fleet. Atlantic Explorer is in compliance with US Coast Guard, UNOLS and American Bureau of Shipping (ABS) regulations as an uninspected oceanographic research vessel and is supported by the National Science Foundation (NSF). Its homeport is St. George's, Bermuda.

The ship was constructed in 1982 as a Class III ocean-going environmental research vessel. In it was known as Seward Johnson II, owned by Harbor Branch Oceanographic Institute and based in Ft. Pierce, Florida. BIOS purchased the vessel in October 2005, and modified it to better support the planned activities. This vessel replaced the previous BIOS research vessel, the smaller Weatherbird II, which had been in use since November 1989.

The most extensive modification made to the new ship was installation of a housing and a deployment station for the institute's 24-place Conductivity, Temperature and Depth (CTD) rosette package, which is extensively used for Bermuda Atlantic Time-series Study (BATS) operations. Modifications were completed by early 2006, and in March 2006 the ship was re-christened Bank of Bermuda Atlantic Explorer (the Bank of Bermuda had made a significant endowment which enabled the vessel's purchase).

The new vessel was still small enough to navigate Ferry Reach, Bermuda and dock at the new BIOS facility, but had significantly larger space for crew, researcher berths, and research areas. The deck space can accommodate four  scientific vans or work boats. Buoys or instrument packets can be launched and retrieved.

BIOS history
The Bermuda Institute of Ocean Sciences was established in Bermuda in 1903 as the Bermuda Biological Station for Research, Inc. and is a US non-profit research and educational institution. On 5 September 2006 it changed the Station's name to Bermuda Institute of Ocean Sciences.

In support of its expanded mission to provide well-equipped facilities and staff support for resident scientific staff, visiting scientists, faculty, and students from around the world, BIOS obtained the  ship, and in 2006 converted it into the  Atlantic Explorer.

Ready access from Bermuda to the deep ocean makes Atlantic Explorer ideal for short and extended cruises, for repetitive sampling and time series at the same station, and for all projects requiring analytical and other sophisticated shore facilities. Atlantic Explorer spends an average of 150 days per year at sea. Typical cruises run from day-trips to two week cruises.

Specifications

Atlantic Explorer is equipped with navigational, laboratory and mechanical facilities to support biological, geological, chemical and physical oceanographic research. Deploying and recovering deep ocean instrumentation moorings, conducting CTD casts, chemical sampling, and gear testing are among the number of operations within the ship's capabilities.

Ship specifications
Built: 1982
Last conversion: 2006
Gross Tonnage: 299 (GT) (861 ITC)
Net Tonnage: 203 (NT) (258 ITC)
Weather limitations Station-keeping (CTD casts) Sea state 5 (30 kn wind)
Personnel capacity: 12 crew berths
Scientific berths: 22
Total berths: 34
Laboratory
Main laboratory: 
Aft laboratory: 
Forward laboratory: 
CTD garage (Complete enclosure for CTD rosette): 
Radiation laboratory (portable):

Usage
Requests for ship time may originate from scientists located at any university or institution. Ship costs for National Science Foundation (NSF) supported research projects are provided by NSF directly to BIOS as part of the annual NSF fleet support grants. Investigators seeking support from agencies other than NSF should include ship costs in their budgets to those agencies.

References

External links
 
 

Research vessels
1982 ships